Elaeocarpus hookerianus, commonly known as pokaka, is a native forest tree of New Zealand. A cold tolerant plant, E. hookerianus can be found from valley floors to mountainous areas.

Like many other New Zealand trees it has a distinctive juvenile form where its branches are interlaced and have tiny leaves.

References

hookerianus
Trees of New Zealand
Flora of New Zealand